Rodrigo Rocha is a Brazilian goalkeeper who played for a Brazilian seven-a-side football club, Chapecoense, and the Brazil national seven-a-side team in tournaments organised or associated/affiliated with FIF7. He is best known for winning the FIF7 World Best Goalkeeper Award in 2017.

References

 Debutant in the national team, Rodrigo Rocha wins the award for best goalkeeper
f7federation.com
africa.espn.com

1985 births
Living people
Associação Chapecoense de Futebol players
Association football goalkeepers
Brazilian footballers